Lois Jeanette Curtis (14 July 1967 – 3 November 2022) was an American artist and the lead plaintiff in the United States Supreme Court case that became known as the Olmstead Decision in which the court held that the unjustified segregation of people with disabilities was discriminatory, and a breach of the Americans with Disabilities Act.

Early life 
Curtis was born on July 14, 1967, in Atlanta, Georgia. Her mother was Mae (née Traylor) Curtis Keith, and worked as a housekeeper; her father was Melvin Lewis Curtis, who worked as a truck driver. She had two sisters, Bobbie Jean Cloud and Patricia Cook.

Curtis grew up with cognitive and developmental disabilities, both of which interrupted her schooling and created challenges for her family. As such, she often walked away from school resulting in her being incarcerated in jails and psychiatric hospitals, including as a temporary inpatient at the child and adolescent mental health unit of Georgia Regional Hospital. In total, she spent just under twenty years in institutions, from the age of eleven years.

The Olmstead Decision 

Along with Elaine Wilson, Curtis was the lead plaintiff in the Supreme Court of the United States case of Olmstead v. L.C. On June 22, 1999, the court held that the unjustified segregation of people with disabilities was an act of discrimination, as defined by the Americans with Disabilities Act. Justice Ruth Bader Ginsburg ruled that:"confinement in an institution severely diminishes the everyday life activities of individuals, including family relations, social contacts, work options, economic independence, educational advancement and cultural enrichment."The Supreme Court case followed a 1995 federal court case brought by the Atlanta Legal Aid Society who filed the case against Tommy Olmstead, the commissioner of human services for the State of Georgia, demanding that he transfer Curtis out of an institution and into community-based care. At the time, Curtis was aged 26 years. The court held in favor of the Atlanta Legal Aid Society, but the state of Georgia appealed to the Supreme Court.

The Supreme Court case became known as the Olmstead Decision and it changed the way that services are provided to people with disabilities, away from providing care in institutions towards care in the community.

Advocacy and career 
In addition to being an advocate for the rights of people with disabilities, Curtis worked as an artist using pastels and acrylic portraits. On June 20, 2011, Curtis met Barack Obama at the White House and gave him one of her paintings.

Personal life and death 
After the Olmstead decision, Curtis began to live in the community. She had a professional aide and a 'micro board,' a group of people that helped her to meet her goals. When asked about her life in 2014, she said, "Well, I make grits, eggs, and sausage in the morning and sweep the floor. I go out to eat sometimes. I take art classes. I draw pretty pictures and make money. I go out of town and sell me artwork. I go to church and pray to the Lord. I raise my voice high! In the summer I go to the pool and put my feet in the water. Maybe I’ll learn to swim someday. I been fishing. I seen a pig and a horse on a farm. I buy clothes and shoes. I have birthday parties. They a lot of fun. I’m not afraid of big dogs no more. I feel good about myself. My life a better life."

Curtis died of pancreatic cancer at home in Clarkston, Georgia, on November 3, 2022, at the age of 55.

References 

1967 births
2022 deaths
American disability rights activists
21st-century American women artists
21st-century American artists
Activists from Atlanta
Americans with Disabilities Act of 1990
Artists from Georgia (U.S. state)
21st-century African-American women
20th-century African-American women